The 16 Great Turkic Empires (which translates as "16 Great Turkic States") is a concept in Turkish ethnic nationalism, introduced in 1969 by Akib Özbek, map officer and widely invoked by Turkish authorities during the 1980s, under the government of Kenan Evren. Prior to this assertion, the 16 stars on the Presidential Seal of Turkey had been taken as representing sixteen Anatolian beyliks which succeeded the Anatolian Seljuks.<ref>X. Türk Tarih Kongresi, Türk Tarih Kurumu Basımevi, 1994, p. 2947. )</ref>

 The list 
The "16 Great Turkic Empires" are the following:

 Reception 

Turkish nationalist writer, novelist, poet and philosopher, Hüseyin Nihâl Atsız, supporter of the pan-Turkist or Turanism ideology, had noted that while some states with questionable Turkic identity were included in the list (like the Mughal Empire, some ostensibly Turkic states (such as Aq Qoyunlu) were left out, and labeled the list a "fabrication."

In spite of Atsız' criticism, the concept was made a mainstream topos in Turkish national symbolism in the wake of the 1980 Turkish coup d'état, under the presidency of Kenan Evren. The Turkish Postal administration issued a series of stamps dedicated to the 16 Empires in 1984, showing portraits of their respective founders as well as attributed flags. In 1985, Özbek's 16 Empires were invoked as a retrospective explanation of the 16 stars in the presidential seal of Turkey (introduced in 1936).

Several municipal buildings and public parks in Turkey have collections of busts or statues of the founders of the "16 Empires" alongside a statue of Kemal Atatürk, including the municipal buildings of Keçiören (Ankara), Mamak, Ankara, Etimesgut, Niğde, Nevşehir, Pınarbaşı, Kayseri, etc.

In 2000, Türk Telekom produced a series of smart cards dedicated to the topic.

In January 2015, Turkish president Recep Tayyip Erdoğan received Palestinian president Mahmoud Abbas in the Turkish Presidential Palace with a guard of 16 "warriors", actors wearing loosely historical armour and costume, intended to symbolise the 16 empires. The costumes were ridiculed in secular Turkish media outlets, and one of the costumes in particular was mocked as a "bathrobe", becoming a trend on social media under the name of Duşakabinoğulları'' (as it were "sons of the shower cabin" or "showercabinds).

See also 
 Pan-Turkism
 Turanism
Neo-Ottomanism

References

National symbols of Turkey
Turkish nationalism
Pan-Turkism
Turanism